See Ya Later Gladiator is a 1968 Warner Bros. Looney Tunes cartoon directed by Alex Lovy. The short was released on June 29, 1968, and stars Daffy Duck and Speedy Gonzales.

Daffy and Speedy had been paired together in a series of cartoons from 1965 to 1968. This was their final theatrical pairing, and this was also the final theatrical short to star "classic" Warner Bros. characters as well as the last Golden Age of American Animation cartoon to feature Daffy or Speedy. After this short, until the cartoon division closed in 1969, new characters like Cool Cat, Bunny and Claude, Merlin the Magic Mouse, and a few one-shot cartoons made up all of WB's output.

Plot
The plot concerns Daffy and Speedy accidentally being sent back in time via a time machine to Rome, 65 A.D., where Emperor Nero plans to feed them to the lions as entertainment in a gladiator arena. Daffy and Speedy work together to thwart the lions. They soon break Nero's fiddle and angering him to chase after the two.

Back in the present timeline, the scientist discovers Daffy and Speedy being chased by a furious Nero. He manages to bring the two back to the present. However, Nero has accidentally returned with them and is horrified by this. Speedy helps him adjust until the scientist can bring him home. Daffy is about to go to bed when he hears music playing from outside from his room. Much to his dismay, it is Speedy's band playing again. Adding to his annoyance is that Nero has joined the band by playing his fiddle.

Music
The cartoon features a slightly different arrangement of The Merry-Go-Round Broke Down by Bill Lava (the second being 3 Ring Wing-Ding.)

See also
List of American films of 1968

References

External links
 
 

Depictions of Nero on film
1968 animated films
1968 short films
1968 films
Looney Tunes shorts
Animated films about time travel
1960s animated short films
1960s American animated films
1960s Warner Bros. animated short films
Films about gladiatorial combat
Films scored by William Lava
Daffy Duck films
Speedy Gonzales films
Films set in ancient Rome
1960s English-language films
Films directed by Alex Lovy